The Rákospalota Synagogue is a former synagogue which is currently used as a bookstore, located in the XV. District of Rákospalota in Budapest, on Old Fóti Road.

History 
The Jewish community of Rákospalota built the Synagogue between 1926 and 1927 along what is now Old Fóti Road, just one block from the corner of Szentmihályi Road and Old Fóti Road. Its designer was Mihály Feith and its design was Gábor Feith. 

The Jewish community in Rákospalota gained its independence in 1902. The first rabbi of the community, elected in 1898 - when the community still belonged to Újpest  - was the legendary genius, Chief Rabbi Yitzchak (Yitzchak – a name added to him during illness according to Jewish custom) Michael Dushinsky, [There are many spellings of this family name, such as: Duschinsky, Dushinsky, also Duschinskie, also Dusinszky, and even Dušinský and Dušinski, and also Duszinski! And more; all according to the usual spelling in the same European country or in a mixture of spellings].

Rabbi Yitzchak Michael Dushinsky served as the community leader for 41 years until his death in 1939. Thanks to him, the community enjoyed great public respect and esteem.

To cover the construction costs, a small, 44-page Book-of-Blessings was published in 1926, showing a drawing of the façade of the then-future building.

The synagogue became depopulated after World War II, due to the murder by the Nazis and their helpers among the Hungarians. The building has been used as a map warehouse since the 1960s, and since the 1980s, when it was bought by the National Széchényi Library (NSZL) it has been used as one of NSZL warehouses.

Gallery

Sources 
 http://bpxv.blog.hu/2017/04/24/ember_varos_feith_gabor_feith_mihaly_rakospalota_vigado_varoshaza_zsinagoga
 A rákospalotai zsinagóga építkezésének emlékére (imakönyv), Rákospalotai Autonóm Ortodox Izraelita Hitközség, Rákospalota, 1926.
 http://epa.oszk.hu/01000/01090/00002/pdf/00002.pdf

External links
Rákospalota Synagogue in the Bezalel Narkiss Index of Jewish Art, Center for Jewish Art, Hebrew University of Jerusalem.

Synagogues in Budapest
Former synagogues in Hungary
Synagogues completed in 1927
15th District of Budapest